Odites incallida is a moth in the family Depressariidae. It was described by Edward Meyrick in 1915. It is found in southern India.

The wingspan is about 17 mm. The forewings are pale ochreous yellowish and the hindwings are light grey.

References

Moths described in 1915
Odites
Taxa named by Edward Meyrick